Sutton is an unincorporated community in Cook County, Illinois, United States. Sutton is within Barrington Township, east of Barrington Hills and west of South Barrington.

References

Unincorporated communities in Illinois
Unincorporated communities in Cook County, Illinois
Chicago metropolitan area